Vilanterol (INN, USAN) is an ultra-long-acting β2 adrenoreceptor agonist (ultra-LABA), which was approved in May 2013 in combination with fluticasone furoate for sale as Breo Ellipta by GlaxoSmithKline for the treatment of chronic obstructive pulmonary disease (COPD).. The combination is also approved for the treatment of asthma in Europe, Japan and New Zealand.

Vilanterol is available in following combinations:

 with inhaled corticosteroid fluticasone furoate—fluticasone furoate/vilanterol (trade names Breo Ellipta (U.S., NZ), Relvar Ellipta (EU, RU, JPN))
 with muscarinic antagonist umeclidinium bromide—umeclidinium bromide/vilanterol (trade name Anoro Ellipta)
 with inhaled corticosteroid fluticasone furoate and muscarinic antagonist umeclidinium bromide—fluticasone furoate/umeclidinium bromide/vilanterol (trade name Trelegy Ellipta)

See also
 Salmeterol—a long-acting β2 adrenoreceptor agonist (LABA) with a similar backbone.

References

Long-acting beta2-adrenergic agonists
Phenylethanolamines